The Mayor of Kolkata is the chief executive of the Kolkata Municipal Corporation, one of the civic authorities in the Indian city of Kolkata. He is the First Citizen of the city of Kolkata. There have been 38 mayors of Kolkata in total till now since first election in 1924.

History
The first Kolkata Municipal Election was held on 16 April 1924, during the time of British India, under the Calcutta Municipal Act, 1923 - Bengal Act III of 1923. Mayors were elected on an annual basis. No corporation elections were held, therefore there was no mayor, from 1948 to 1952. In 1952 further mayors were appointed on an annual basis under the Calcutta Municipal Act, West Bengal Act XXXIII of 1951. There was another break in mayoral elections from 1972 to 1985, after which mayors were elected on a five year term under the Calcutta Municipal Corporation Act, 1980 West Bengal Act LIX of 1980.

List of mayors

References

Mayors of Kolkata